Henry Steedman (1866–1953) was a Scottish-born Australian botanist.

Born in Scotland in 1866, he emigrated to Western Australia at the age of 21. He was head gardener at the South Perth Zoological Gardens (now Perth Zoo) for many years, but was retrenched in the late 1920s with the onset of the Great Depression. Thereafter he spent his time collecting seeds and specimens of native plants. He made a number of collecting expeditions, including one east to Kalgoorlie with Ivan Carnaby; another south as far as Ravensthorpe, also with Carnaby; and one along the west coast from Bunbury to Geraldton.

Notes

References

Further reading 
 West Australian Naturalist 9 (1965).

1866 births
1953 deaths
Scottish botanists
People from Perth, Western Australia